The Santa Fe River is river in Santa Fe and Sandoval counties in New Mexico, United States, that is a tributary of the Rio Grande.

Description
The river starts in the Sangre de Cristo mountain range and passes through the state capital, Santa Fe providing approximately 40% of the city's water supply.  It is an
intermittent stream with two perennial reaches.

It was first dammed in 1881 and flows when water is released by the city of Santa Fe from two continuous reservoirs. The site of the 1881 dam, upstream of Santa Fe, is now part of the  Santa Fe Canyon Preserve, a trailhead for the  Dale Ball Foothill Trail System.

The environmental group American Rivers designated the Santa Fe River as America's most endangered river of 2007, and Santa Fe Mayor David Coss made reviving the river one of his administration's top priorities.

Santa Fe River Trail

As of 2007, the Santa Fe River Trail existed in short segments, within Santa Fe (city) and Santa Fe County, and the city and county developed plans to link those segments.  The initial push was to develop the trail from the city downstream;  this was the corridor of the historic El Camino Real de Tierra Adentro, which approached Santa Fe from downstream via the Santa Fe River Canyon below the east rim of the Caja del Rio.  The paraje on the Camino Real before Santa Fe was in La Cienega, at what is now El Rancho de las Golondrinas. From Patrick Smith Park to NM 599 the trail will eventually stretch 13 miles point-to-point.

In the spring of 2012 construction was completed on a new 1.3 mi section of the trail from Camino Alire west to Frenchy's Field Park. The work through this section includes extensive rehabilitation of the riverbed, significant erosion protection structures, and the addition of hundreds of cottonwood saplings and willows along the entire 1.3 mi stretch.

Further west on the county-managed stretch of the river, two orphan sections of the trail wait to be connected to the existing system. One section extends west for a mile beginning at the Community Farm at San Ysidro crossing. The other extends north and west from Agua Fria and Dominguez Lane toward the Municipal Recreation Center on Caja del Rio Rd.

Tributary arroyos
The arroyos of Santa Fe drain the  Santa Fe area into the river.

See also

 Rio Grande Trail
 List of New Mexico rivers
 List of tributaries of the Rio Grande

Notes
American Rivers 2007 Report

References

External links

 Santa Fe Watershed Association
   City of Santa Fe River Page
 ¡YouthWorks! Santa Fe River Restoration Crew

Rivers of New Mexico
Tributaries of the Rio Grande
Rivers of Sandoval County, New Mexico
Rivers of Santa Fe County, New Mexico